Tucker Creek is a stream in Oregon County in the Ozarks of southern Missouri.

The stream source area lies about 2.5 miles west of Alton and the stream flows almost due east  past Alton on the south and joins Piney Creek about one half mile east of the town after passing under Missouri Route 19.

Tucker Creek, historically called "Tucker Branch", has the name of John Tucker, a pioneer citizen.

See also
List of rivers of Missouri

References

Rivers of Oregon County, Missouri
Rivers of Missouri